Paradise in Harlem is a 1939 American musical comedy-drama film written by Frank H. Wilson and directed by Joseph Seiden. It was first shown in 1939 starring Frank H. Wilson. It was released by Jubilee Production Co.

Premise 
An actor sees a mob execution and is run out of town by the aforesaid mob members.

Cast 
Frank H. Wilson as Lem Anderson
Mamie Smith as Madame Mamie
Norman Astwood as Rough Jackson
Edna Mae Harris as Doll Davis
Merritt Smith as Ned Avery
Francine Everett as Desdemona Jones
Sidney Easton as Sneeze Ancrum
Babe Matthews as Laura Lou
Lionel Monagas as Matt Gilson
Madeline Belt as Acme Delight
Herman Green as Ganaway
Percy Verwayen as Spanish
George Williams as Runt
Alec Lovejoy as Misery
Lucky Millinder as himself - Bandleader
Juanita Hall as Singer in Audience

Soundtrack 
 Lucky Millinder with band & chorus - "I Gotta Put You Down" (Written by Lucky Millinder)
 Mamie Smith - "Lord, I Love that Man"
 Edna Mae Harris and Lucky Millinder - "Harlem Serenade" (Written by Vincent Valentini)
 Sidney Easton and Babe Matthews - "How D'You Figure I'll Miss You?"
 Mamie Smith and The Alphabetical Four - "Harlem Blues" (Written by Perry Bradford)
 Babe Matthews - "Why Am I so Blue?" (Written by Joe Thomas)
 Juanita Hall, Singers, Francine Everett, Frank C. Wilson and Babe Matthews - Gospel version of "Othello" (Written by Juanita Hall)

References

External links 
 
 
  (updated from "Crazy Blues")

1939 films
1930s musical comedy-drama films
American musical comedy-drama films
American black-and-white films
Films set in Harlem
1939 comedy films
1939 drama films
Race films
American crime comedy-drama films
1939 crime films
1930s English-language films
1930s American films
1930s crime comedy-drama films